Stephen Michael Tensi (born December 8, 1942) is a former professional American football quarterback in the American Football League (AFL) and the National Football League (NFL). He played for the San Diego Chargers (1965–1966) and the Denver Broncos (1967–1970).

College career
Tensi came to Florida State from Elder High School in Cincinnati, Ohio, where he had been his high school MVP and first-team All City and Cincinnati Post All-Metro. His biggest collegiate success came in 1964, his senior year at FSU. The Seminoles switched to a pro-set offense that year and had one of the highest scoring teams in college football, averaging nearly 24 points a game. Tensi threw for 1,683 yards and 14 TDs in FSU's 10 games, many of which were thrown to first-team All American and future Oakland Raiders great Fred Biletnikoff. Behind the Tensi to Biletnikoff tandem, and a defense which had four shutouts, Florida State enjoyed its best record up until that time, going 9–1–1. Their victories included a blowout win over #5 ranked University of Kentucky and the Seminoles' first win ever against the University of Florida. Tensi capped the season with 5 touchdown passes and 303 yards in passing (and four interceptions) in Florida State's 36–19 Gator Bowl victory over the University of Oklahoma. He and Biletnikoff were named co-FSU players of the game.
In 1981, Tensi was named to Florida State's athletic Hall of Fame.

Professional career
Tensi was drafted by the NFL's Baltimore Colts and the AFL's San Diego Chargers. Rather than go to the Colts—led then by Johnny Unitas—Tensi signed with the Chargers immediately after the Gator Bowl. Seminoles coach Bill Peterson learned his pro set offense from Chargers' coach Sid Gillman, and the Seminoles used some of the same terminology in their offense as the Chargers as well. However, Tensi played little in San Diego, backing up quarterback John Hadl. Tensi did not throw a single pass in 1965, but threw 5 touchdown passes against only one interception in limited duty in 1966. On October 2, 1966, Tensi became the first quarterback since Fran Tarkenton to throw 4 touchdown passes in his first career start.

The Denver Broncos were in the market for a new quarterback for 1967. In 1966, they started four different quarterbacks and played a total of five. These five signal callers combined for a ratio of 12 touchdown passes to 30 interceptions, and finished last in the American Football League in scoring. On August 15, 1967, shortly before the 1967 season, new coach and general manager Lou Saban traded Denver's #1 draft picks in the 1968 and 1969 common AFL-NFL draft for Tensi. These proved to be valuable picks for San Diego, becoming the #4 and #9 overall selections respectively. Tensi started 12 of 14 games for the Broncos in 1967, who finished 3–11 and allowed the most points in the AFL. However, their offensive numbers were an improvement over 1966. According to former Broncos executive Jim Saccomano, Tensi's effectiveness and health in Denver was hamstrung by weak pass protection. In 1968, Tensi's football career took a major hit as his collarbone was broken twice—first in a preseason game against the San Francisco 49ers and later in a regular season game. Tensi's injuries helped open the door for rookie Marlin Briscoe to play quarterback for the Broncos and become the first African-American quarterback in modern American pro football history. However, Tensi was back as the starting quarterback for 1969 after Briscoe was traded to Buffalo. But after winning only 4 of his 13 starts that year, Tensi was replaced as the starter by Pete Liske partway through the 1970 season. His last game was against the Oakland Raiders on November 15, 1970.  After the season, Tensi recalled, "The injury affected my shoulder, and I just couldn't throw with strength anymore. I told Lou (Saban) to find someone else. I was retiring."

Comments by football scouts on Tensi late in his career noted his excellent size (at 6'5", he was one of the tallest pro quarterbacks of his day) but gave him mixed reviews in other areas. One scout said, "Tensi has excellent size for a quarterback. He's tall enough to throw over defensive linemen from the pocket. He can set up shorter than most quarterbacks due to his height. He has a very strong arm and can throw long and he also has good accuracy on short routes. He can beat you with the bomb if his protection holds up, but he is not a good scrambler." Another scout said, "Tensi is just fair. He's a big tall guy who can throw the ball but he doesn't have the peripheral vision which allows you to look and pick things out. Other quarterbacks have better clarity of vision as far as seeing people in the secondary."

Post-playing career
Tensi worked as receivers coach for the 1974 Chicago Fire of the World Football League. He later joined his father-in-law in the construction business in Miami and later moved to a small town in North Carolina. He is married to his college sweetheart Barbara Jean, who he met at freshman orientation at Florida State.

See also
 List of American Football League players

References

1942 births
Living people
Players of American football from Cincinnati
American football quarterbacks
Elder High School alumni
Florida State Seminoles football players
San Diego Chargers players
Denver Broncos (AFL) players
Denver Broncos players
American Football League players